Hnojné is a village and municipality in Michalovce District in the Kosice Region of eastern Slovakia.

History
In historical records the village was first mentioned in 1390.

Geography
The village lies at an altitude of 108 metres and covers an area of 6.811 km². It has a population of about 250 people.

Ethnicity
The population is about 99% Slovak in ethnicity.

Culture
The village has a small public library and food stores.

Transport
The nearest railway station is 17 kilometres away at Michalovce.

Genealogical resources

The records for genealogical research are available at the state archive "Statny Archiv in Presov, Slovakia"

 Greek Catholic church records (births/marriages/deaths): 1805-1937 (parish B)

Gallery

See also
 List of municipalities and towns in Slovakia

References

External links

 
https://web.archive.org/web/20071116010355/http://www.statistics.sk/mosmis/eng/run.html
Surnames of living people in Hnojne

Villages and municipalities in Michalovce District